Rhynchoconger squaliceps is an eel in the family Congridae (conger/garden eels). It was described by Alfred William Alcock in 1894, originally under the genus Congromuraena. It is a marine, tropical eel which is known from the Bay of Bengal, in the western Indian Ocean.

References

Congridae
Fish described in 1894